In theoretical physics, the Rarita–Schwinger equation is the
relativistic field equation of spin-3/2 fermions. It is similar to the Dirac equation for spin-1/2 fermions. This equation was first introduced by William Rarita and Julian Schwinger in 1941. 

In modern notation it can be written as:

where  is the Levi-Civita symbol,
 is the mass,
,
It corresponds to the  representation of the Lorentz group, or rather, its  part.

This field equation can be derived as the Euler–Lagrange equation corresponding to the Rarita–Schwinger Lagrangian:

where the bar above  denotes the Dirac adjoint.

This equation controls the propagation of the wave function of composite objects such as the delta baryons or for the  conjectural gravitino. So far, no elementary particle with spin 3/2 has been found experimentally.  

The massless Rarita–Schwinger equation has a fermionic gauge symmetry: is invariant under the gauge transformation , where   is an arbitrary spinor field. This is simply the local supersymmetry of supergravity, and the field must be a gravitino.

"Weyl" and "Majorana" versions of the Rarita–Schwinger equation also exist.

Equations of motion in the massless case
Consider a massless Rarita–Schwinger field described by the Lagrangian density

where the sum over spin indices is implicit,  are Majorana spinors, and

To obtain the equations of motion we vary the Lagrangian with respect to the fields , obtaining:

using the Majorana flip properties
we see that the second and first terms on the RHS are equal, concluding that

plus unimportant boundary terms.
Imposing  we thus see that the equation of motion for a massless Majorana Rarita–Schwinger spinor reads:

Drawbacks of the equation
The current description of massive, higher spin fields through either Rarita–Schwinger or Fierz–Pauli formalisms is afflicted with several maladies.

Superluminal propagation

As in the case of the Dirac equation, electromagnetic interaction can be added by promoting the partial derivative to gauge covariant derivative:
.
In 1969, Velo and Zwanziger showed that the Rarita–Schwinger Lagrangian coupled to electromagnetism leads to equation with solutions representing wavefronts, some of which propagate faster than light. In other words, 
the field then suffers from acausal, superluminal propagation; consequently, the quantization in interaction with electromagnetism is essentially flawed. In extended supergravity, though, Das and Freedman have shown that local supersymmetry solves this problem.

References

Sources
 
 Collins P.D.B., Martin A.D., Squires E.J., Particle physics and cosmology (1989) Wiley, Section 1.6.
 
 
 

Quantum field theory
Spinors
Partial differential equations
Fermions
Equations of physics
Mathematical physics